Tretzevents or Puig de Tres Vents is a mountain of the Canigó Massif, Pyrenees, Pyrénées-Orientales, France. Located between the communes of Cortsaví (Corsavy) and El Tec (Le Tech), Pyrénées-Orientales, it has an elevation of 2,731 metres above sea level. A secondary 2,727 m high summit is located at the limit of the Castell de Vernet (Casteil) commune.

See also
Canigó (Canigou)
Mountains of Catalonia

References

Mountains of Catalonia
Mountains of the Pyrenees